Lee Won-il (born December 12, 1979) is a South Korean chef and television personality. He was a cast member in the variety shows Please Take Care of My Refrigerator (seasons 1-2) and Cook Representative.

Education 
Lee lived in Philippines from 2002 until 2008. In 2008, Lee earned a BSc degree in Hotel, Restaurant and Institution Management at the University of the Philippines Diliman in Philippines.

Career 
Lee is the former owner and chef of Dear Bread and, as of 2020, owns and operates Lee Won-il Table, a 14-seat restaurant in Hannam-dong, Yongsan-gu, Seoul.

On August 24, 2020, Lee and his fiancée, television producer Kim Yoo-jin, announced they would be leaving the cast of the MBC TV celebrity-couple reality show Don't Be Jealous. The announcement followed multiple media reports accusing Kim of bullying behavior, including physical abuse, dating back to 2008 and earlier. Kim was a minor at the time the incidents were alleged to have occurred.

Filmography

Web shows

References

External links

1979 births
Living people
Bakers
South Korean television chefs
University of the Philippines alumni
Chefs of Korean cuisine
South Korean chefs